Jeffrey G. Xavier (born 7 September 1985) is a Cape Verdean basketball player who plays for UJAP Quimper 29 in LNB Pro B. He is a 2009 graduate of Providence College. Xavier transferred to Providence after two years at Manhattan College. Xavier is a member of the Cape Verde national basketball team. He is a graduate of St. Raphael Academy in Pawtucket. Born in the United States, he represents Cape Verde internationally.

Professional career
In 2009-10 season he signed with Leche Río Breogán, team of LEB Oro. In the next season, he went to Cáceres 2016 of the same league. In 2011, Xavier signed with his third LEB Oro team in three seasons: Palencia Baloncesto.

National team career

Xavier is a member of the Cape Verde national basketball team and played with them at the AfroBasket 2021 qualifiers.

Trophies
CB Atapuerca
LEB Oro: (1) 2012–13.
Copa Príncipe de Asturias: (1) 2013.

References

External links
LEB Oro profile

1985 births
Living people
African-American basketball players
American people of Cape Verdean descent
Basketball players from Rhode Island
Cáceres Ciudad del Baloncesto players
Cape Verdean men's basketball players
CB Breogán players
FC Porto basketball players
Manhattan Jaspers basketball players
Medi Bayreuth players
Sportspeople from Pawtucket, Rhode Island
Point guards
Providence Friars men's basketball players
Shooting guards
Palencia Baloncesto players
American men's basketball players
21st-century African-American sportspeople
20th-century African-American people